Cara de Fogo is a 1958 Brazilian adventure film directed by Galileu Garcia. It was entered into the 1st Moscow International Film Festival.

Cast
 Alberto Ruschel as Luís
 Milton Ribeiro as Gadanho
 Lucy Reis as Mariana
 Ana Maria Nabuco as Rosalina
 Gilberto Chagas as Zé Pachola
 Eugenio Kusnet as Tonico
 Jose de Jesús as Pedrinho

References

External links
 

1958 films
1958 adventure films
Brazilian adventure films
1950s Portuguese-language films